Dheeraj Dhoopar (born 20 December 1984) is an Indian actor and model who appears in Hindi television. He is best known for his portrayal of Prem Bharadwaj in Sasural Simar Ka and Karan Luthra in Kundali Bhagya for which he received several awards including Gold Awards and Indian Television Academy Awards for Best Actor Male (Popular).

Personal life

Dhoopar was born to Sushil Dhoopar on 20 December 1984. He married actress Vinny Arora on 16 November 2016 in Delhi. They first met on the sets of Maat Pitaah Ke Charnon Mein Swarg. In April 2022, they announced that they were expecting their first child. On 10 August 2022, the couple had their first child, a boy, Zayn.

Career
Dhoopar started his career as a model and featured in over hundred commercials for brands like Maruti Suzuki, Parker, Dabur Honey, Samsung Galaxy, Videocon Mobile. Before venturing in acting, Dhoopar did an advanced course in fashion designing as well as worked as an airline cabin crew member.

Dhoopar made his television debut with Maat Pitaah Ke Charnon Mein Swarg as Ansh. He also played Bhavesh Patel in Star Plus's Behenein, Sushant in Mrs. Tendulkar and Shikhar in Zindagi Kahe – Smile Please. He also made a cameo appearance in Sony TV's Kuch Toh Log Kahenge.

From 2013 to 2017, he portrayed Prem Bhardwaj in Colors TV's Sasural Simar Ka opposite Dipika Kakar. He also hosted the grand finale of Sa Re Ga Ma Pa. From July 12th 2017 to June 9th 2022, he played the lead role of Karan Luthra in Zee TV's Kundali Bhagya opposite Shraddha Arya for 5 years .

In 2019, he also hosted Dance India Dance 7 but later quit.

In 2020, Dhoopar portrayed a cameo role of Cheel Akesh and Shakura respectively, opposite Hina Khan in Naagin 5.

In June 2022, Dhoopar quitted Kundali to take a paternity break for his pregnant wife Vinny Arora. In July 2022, Dhoopar announced that he is participating in Jhalak Dikhhla Jaa 10 but walked out of the show in Week 4 owing to health and personal issues. From 2022 to 2023, he signed Colors TV's Sherdil Shergill opposite Surbhi Chandna as Rajkumar Yadav.

Media 
Dhoopar was ranked in The Times Most Desirable Men On TV at No. 12 in 2019, at No. 9 in 2020.

Dhoopar was ranked in The Times Most Desirable Men at No. 47 in 2019, at No. 45 in 2020.

Filmography

Television

Special appearances

Music videos

Awards and nominations

See also 
 List of Indian television actors

References

External links

 
 

1984 births
Living people
Male actors in Hindi television
Indian male television actors
Indian male soap opera actors
Actors from Mumbai